Corymbia lamprophylla, commonly known as the shiny-leaved bloodwood, is a species of tree that is endemic to central Queensland. It has rough, tessellated bark on the trunk and larger branches, lance-shaped adult leaves, flower buds in groups of seven, creamy white flowers and urn-shaped fruit.

Description
Flowering occurs from January to April and the flowers are creamy white.

Taxonomy and naming
The shiny-leaved bloodwood was first formally described in 1987 by Ian Brooker and Anthony Bean in the journal Brunonia, and was given the name Eucalyptus lamprophylla from specimens they collected in the "Torrens River" catchment in the White Mountains in 1985. In 1995, Ken Hill and Lawrie Johnson changed the name to Corymbia lamprophylla.

Distribution and habitat
Corymbia lamprophylla grows in shallow, sandy soil on elevated sandstone or granite mainly from near Paluma to the White Mountains in central eastern Queensland.

Conservation status
This eucalypt is classified as of "least concern" under the Queensland Government Nature Conservation Act 1992.

See also
 List of Corymbia species

References

lamprophylla
Myrtales of Australia
Flora of Queensland
Plants described in 1987